Harry Snell (7 October 1916 – 8 May 1985) was a Swedish cyclist. He competed in the individual and team road race events at the 1948 Summer Olympics.

See also
Crescent bicycles

References

External links
 

1916 births
1985 deaths
Swedish male cyclists
Olympic cyclists of Sweden
Cyclists at the 1948 Summer Olympics
People from Borås
Sportspeople from Västra Götaland County